Korel is a given name. Notable people with the name include:

 Korel Engin (born 1980), American-born Turkish basketball player
 Korel Tunador, American singer

See also
 Korek (surname)
 Korey

Turkish unisex given names